The Visitor is the fourth book in the Jack Reacher series written by Lee Child. It was published in 2000 by Bantam Press in the United Kingdom. In the United States, the book was released under the title Running Blind. It is written in the second and third person. In the novel, retired Army military police officer Jack Reacher must race against time to catch a sophisticated serial killer who is murdering a group of female soldiers, but leaving no forensic evidence.

Plot summary
The prologue opens with a mystery person's point of view on knowledge, power and killing, "People say that knowledge is power. The more knowledge, the more power. Suppose you knew the winning numbers for the lottery? You would run to the store. And you would win. Same for the stock market. You're not talking about a trend or a percentage game or a whisper or a tip. You're talking about knowledge. Real, hard knowledge. You would buy. Then later you'd sell, and you'd be rich. Any kind of sports at all, if you could predict the future, you'd be home and dry. Same for anything. Same for killing people."

In New York City, Reacher confronts and beats up two thugs sent to collect protection racket money from the new restaurant in which he has just finished dinners, and deliberately implies to the thugs that he is a member of a rival crime organisation. Reacher is picked up by the FBI and questioned but explains he's been a loner since he mustered out of the army. He is then questioned about two women whose cases of sexual harassment he dealt with when he was an MP. It is revealed they have both been killed in the last few months and a criminal profiling team has come to the conclusion that the person responsible was someone exactly like Reacher. Reacher realizes that he has no alibi for the places and times that the women were killed, and he requests a lawyer.

Reacher's lawyer girlfriend Jodie arrives, and he is released after further questioning. Jodie returns to work, and Reacher drives to his house in upstate New York that he inherited from Leon Garber. He is soon called upon by two members of the FBI team that previously questioned him. A third woman has been killed who was also an ex-soldier who filed for sexual harassment – albeit in a different timeframe from the first two. The FBI compels him to assist with the investigation by threatening to hurt him and, possibly, Jodie too.

Reacher and Special Agent Lamarr, the lead profiler on the team, drive from New York to the FBI Academy in Quantico, Virginia, whilst discussing information on the case. Lamarr's stepsister, it so happens, is a woman with the same particulars as the three already killed. Lamarr also reveals the killer's M.O., which is killing the victims in an unknown way, with no bruises or injuries, leaving them naked in their bathtub, filled with army-issue camouflage paint.

The team holds several meetings at Quantico, and Reacher meets agent Lisa Harper, the woman who has to accompany Reacher wherever he goes. Reacher suggests contacting Colonel John Trent at Fort Dix to inquire about special forces soldiers and the three week rotation (another of Lamarr's misdirects of the investigation). Reacher and Harper head up to New Jersey, but while Harper remains outside the colonel's office due to security clearance reasons, the colonel helps Reacher sneak out the window and arranges a four-hour trip to New York. Once there Jack targets a random pair of criminals collecting protection money and deliberately instigates a turf war between rival racketeers. By taking a certain crime lord out of the picture this effectively removes the leverage that the FBI has had over him and Jodie. He returns to New Jersey with Agent Harper being none the wiser.

The team continues the search, and the next victim is Agent Lamarr's stepsister. Local policemen are then put on surveillance of the remaining women on the list. Eventually Reacher and Harper catch the killer. It is none other than FBI Agent Lamarr. She is in the process of killing her fifth victim when Jack intervenes. Reacher and Harper come to the conclusion that Lamarr was utilising her hypnotising techniques to make the victims unwittingly suffocate themselves by swallowing their own tongues. Her motives were a family inheritance and a sociopathic bitterness to her stepsister; the other murders were carried out to muddy the investigative waters. The FBI is unhappy that Reacher has killed one of their agents, murderess or not, but an accord is eventually reached. Jack then meets up with Jodie, and she reveals she is leaving for London in a month's time. Reacher knows he will not want to go with her, since he misses his wandering ways, and the two agree to spend one last month together.

Production
The Visitor was released in the United Kingdom on 20 April 2000, and the American publication followed on 13 July of the same year.

The reason for the story having two different titles is due to how The Visitor—Child's original title and ultimately the UK title of the story—was seen by Putnam as sounding too much like a science-fiction novel.

Reception
The Visitor was well received, with Publishers Weekly saying "the book harbors two elements that separate it from the pack: a brain-teasing puzzle that gets put together piece by fascinating piece, and a central character with Robin Hood-like integrity and an engagingly eccentric approach to life." American book review journal Kirkus Reviews called it "deeply satisfying" and the reader should "plan to stay up long past bedtime and do some serious hyperventilating toward the end." Booklist also offered a good review, saying "This fourth Reacher thriller is easily the best. The plot is a masterpiece."

The Visitor was nominated for the 2001 Barry Award for "Best Hardcover Novel", but ultimately fell short to Deep South by Nevada Barr.

Awards and nominations
2001 Barry Award nominee, Best Hardcover Novel.

References

External links
Running Blind information page on Lee Child's Official Website

2000 British novels
2000 American novels
Jack Reacher books
Third-person narrative novels
Novels with multiple narrators
Second-person narrative novels
Bantam Press books
Novels set in New Jersey